Johnson Township may refer to:

Arkansas
 Johnson Township, Clay County, Arkansas, in Clay County, Arkansas
 Johnson Township, Little River County, Arkansas, in Little River County, Arkansas
 Johnson Township, Logan County, Arkansas, in Logan County, Arkansas
 Johnson Township, St. Francis County, Arkansas, in St. Francis County, Arkansas
 Johnson Township, Union County, Arkansas, in Union County, Arkansas
 Johnson Township, Washington County, Arkansas

Illinois
 Johnson Township, Christian County, Illinois
 Johnson Township, Clark County, Illinois

Indiana
 Johnson Township, Clinton County, Indiana
 Johnson Township, Crawford County, Indiana
 Johnson Township, Gibson County, Indiana
 Johnson Township, Knox County, Indiana
 Johnson Township, LaGrange County, Indiana
 Johnson Township, LaPorte County, Indiana
 Johnson Township, Ripley County, Indiana
 Johnson Township, Scott County, Indiana

Iowa
 Johnson Township, Plymouth County, Iowa
 Johnson Township, Webster County, Iowa

Kansas
 Johnson Township, Ness County, Kansas, in Ness County, Kansas

Minnesota
 Johnson Township, Polk County, Minnesota

Missouri
 Johnson Township, Carter County, Missouri
 Johnson Township, Maries County, Missouri
 Johnson Township, Oregon County, Missouri
 Johnson Township, Polk County, Missouri
 Johnson Township, Ripley County, Missouri
 Johnson Township, Scotland County, Missouri
 Johnson Township, Washington County, Missouri

North Dakota
 Johnson Township, Wells County, North Dakota, in Wells County, North Dakota

Ohio
 Johnson Township, Champaign County, Ohio

Township name disambiguation pages